"So Hot Right Now" is a song by Australian musician Jade MacRae and was released in February 2005 as the second single from her self-titled debut album Jade MacRae.  The song peaked at number 18 on the ARIA Charts.

Video
The scene for the video is set in a club with a bar and sees Jade and all her girls with their boyfriends hanging out, as Jade follows the camera as it changes angles. The video then fades out to Jade singing with her band behind her at the same club, before fading out a second time to Jade's fellow R&B star Israel who also produced her album, as he adds his rap to the track, before going back to Jade as she performs to the crowd.

Track listing
CD Single
 "So Hot Right Now" (Single Version)
 "So Hot Right Now" (Alternative Elite Fleet Remix)
 "So Hot Right Now" (A.K.47 Remix)
 "Feel"
 "So Hot Right Now" (Album version)

Charts

References

2005 singles
2005 songs
Songs written by Jade MacRae
Songs written by Israel Cruz